Gynochthodes is a genus of flowering plants in the family Rubiaceae. The genus is found from Madagascar to tropical and subtropical Asia and the Pacific region.

Species

Gynochthodes alejandroi 
Gynochthodes ammitia 
Gynochthodes artensis 
Gynochthodes australiensis 
Gynochthodes badia 
Gynochthodes bartlingii 
Gynochthodes billardierei 
Gynochthodes boninensis 
Gynochthodes brevipes 
Gynochthodes bucidifolia 
Gynochthodes calciphila 
Gynochthodes callicarpifolia 
Gynochthodes candollei 
Gynochthodes canthoides 
Gynochthodes celebica 
Gynochthodes cinnamomea 
Gynochthodes cinnamomifoliata 
Gynochthodes citrina 
Gynochthodes cochinchinensis 
Gynochthodes collina 
Gynochthodes constipata 
Gynochthodes coriacea 
Gynochthodes costata 
Gynochthodes decipiens 
Gynochthodes deplanchei 
Gynochthodes elliptifolia 
Gynochthodes elmeri 
Gynochthodes epiphytica 
Gynochthodes gjellerupii 
Gynochthodes glaucescens 
Gynochthodes glomerata 
Gynochthodes grayi 
Gynochthodes hainanensis 
Gynochthodes hirtella 
Gynochthodes hispida 
Gynochthodes hollrungiana 
Gynochthodes howiana 
Gynochthodes hupehensis 
Gynochthodes jackiana 
Gynochthodes jasminoides 
Gynochthodes kanalensis 
Gynochthodes lacunosa 
Gynochthodes lanuginosa 
Gynochthodes lenticellata 
Gynochthodes leonardii 
Gynochthodes leparensis 
Gynochthodes leptocalama 
Gynochthodes litseifolia 
Gynochthodes macrophylla 
Gynochthodes micrantha 
Gynochthodes microcephala 
Gynochthodes mindanaensis 
Gynochthodes mollis 
Gynochthodes montana 
Gynochthodes motleyi 
Gynochthodes myrtifolia 
Gynochthodes nanlingensis 
Gynochthodes neocaledonica 
Gynochthodes nigra 
Gynochthodes nitida 
Gynochthodes oblongifolia 
Gynochthodes officinalis 
Gynochthodes oligantha 
Gynochthodes oligocephala 
Gynochthodes oresbia 
Gynochthodes parvifolia 
Gynochthodes philippinensis 
Gynochthodes phyllireoides 
Gynochthodes platyphylla 
Gynochthodes podistra 
Gynochthodes polillensis 
Gynochthodes polyneura 
Gynochthodes proboscidea 
Gynochthodes puberula 
Gynochthodes pubifolia 
Gynochthodes pubiofficinalis 
Gynochthodes retropila 
Gynochthodes retusa 
Gynochthodes ridleyi 
Gynochthodes ridsdalei 
Gynochthodes rigida 
Gynochthodes rugulosa 
Gynochthodes sarmentosa 
Gynochthodes scabrifolia 
Gynochthodes sessilis 
Gynochthodes shuanghuaensis 
Gynochthodes subcaudata 
Gynochthodes sublanceolata 
Gynochthodes suratmanii 
Gynochthodes triandra 
Gynochthodes trimera 
Gynochthodes truncata 
Gynochthodes umbellata 
Gynochthodes verticillata 
Gynochthodes villosa 
Gynochthodes wallichii 
Gynochthodes wongii

References

 
Rubiaceae genera